L is the twelfth letter of the Latin alphabet.

L or l may also refer to:

Units of measurement
 L, Langmuir (unit), a unit of exposure to a surface
 L, length
 L, l or ℓ, litre unit

Science

Mathematics
 , constructible universe, a particular class of sets which can be described entirely in terms of simpler sets
 L-function
 Laplace transform
 , likelihood function
 ℓp space, the space of sequences with a finite p-norm
 Lp space, a function space defined using a natural generalization of the p-norm for finite-dimensional vector spaces

Computing
 L (complexity), a complexity class in computational complexity theory
 L-notation, a notation for running times of subexponential algorithms, often used in number theory
 L – A Mathemagical Adventure, a 1984 computer game
 Android L, code name for Android Lollipop

Physics
 Angular momentum
 Inductance, the ratio of the magnetic flux to the current in an electrical circuit
 Latent heat
 Luminosity
 Mean free path, the average distance traveled by a moving particle between successive collisions
 Class L, a stellar classification
 Galactic longitude (l), in the galactic coordinate system

Chemistry
 l, an abbreviation for liquid
 Avogadro constant, in some German scientific literature
 Leucine, an α-amino acid
 L- prefix, a levorotatiory compound
 Lewisite, a blister agent

Biology
 Carl Linnaeus, in botanist author citations (L.)
 Laelia, an orchid genus
 Haplogroup L (Y-DNA)
 Vertebra in the lumbar region of the spinal cord
 ATC code L Antineoplastic and immunomodulating agents, a section of the Anatomical Therapeutic Chemical Classification System

Music
 L (French singer), French singer-songwriter
 L (South Korean singer), vocalist of Korean boy band Infinite
 L Marshall, British singer credited as L on the Wretch 32 song "Traktor"
 Lesure Number, music catalogue identifier for the compositions of Claude Debussy
 L Number, classification of the compositions of Franz Benda according to the catalogue of Douglas A. Lee

Albums
 L (Godley & Creme album) (1978)
 L (Ayumi Hamasaki EP) (2010)
 L (Steve Hillage album) (1976)
 L (Candy Lo EP) (2008)
 L (Moe album) (2000)

Vehicles and transportation
 L (Los Angeles Railway)
 Chicago "L", a rapid transit system in Chicago
 L (New York City Subway service)
 L Line (Los Angeles Metro)
 L-plate, a plate for learning drivers under instruction
 L Taraval (San Francisco Muni)
 Nissan L engine
 L, the low gear of an automatic transmission
 LB&SCR L class, a British tank locomotive on the London, Brighton, and South Coast Railway

Companies and organisations
 L. Inc., California-based corporation that makes organic personal care products
 Liberals (Sweden), a political party in Sweden
 Loews Corporation, by NYSE ticker symbol
 Miscellaneous, when used as the fifth letter or behind-the-dot notation on the NASDAQ and NYSE ticker symbols

Language and literature
 50 (number), in Roman numerals
 [ʟ], the velar lateral approximant (IPA notation)
 [l], the alveolar lateral approximant (IPA notation)
 The "low" or common language in a diglossia
 , a siglum for the Vetus Latina version of the Bible
 L (novel), a 1999 novel by Erlend Loe
 L (Death Note), a character from the Death Note manga series

Places 
 L postcode area, for Liverpool
 L Island, former name for Scawfell Island, Queensland, Australia
 L, the military time zone code for UTC+11:00

Other uses
 Lucius (praenomen), a Roman praenomen
 Left (direction)
 L, a rating of the Brazilian advisory rating system
 L (film), a 2012 Greek film
 L, production code for the 1965 Doctor Who serial The Rescue
 Canon L lens

See also
 Big L (disambiguation)
 El (disambiguation)
 L band (disambiguation)
 L class (disambiguation)
 Lagrangian (disambiguation)
 Loser (hand gesture)